Caged IBC totes are one of, if not the most commonly used of all current intermediate bulk container design types. Caged IBC totes are handling and shipping containers for the storing, transit, and operation integration of various commodities, with the most common being water. Caged IBCs are often utilized as one-use containers, especially when it comes to hazardous materials, but are also suitable for reuse under many conditions. This IBC type often features an interior liner, blow-mold manufactured from polyethylene, that is structurally supported by a protective cage frame, often of galvanized steel composition. Caged IBCs are engineered for the bulk handling of liquids, semi-solids, as well as solid materials. All materials can present certain safety and compatibility concerns, especially hazardous liquids, and proper guidance is always recommended whenever using caged IBC totes for harsh chemicals.

Description 
This IBC design type is a composite intermediate bulk container, as defined within Title 49 CFR, and that has been tested and certified according to UN / DOT requirements for the transport and logistic handling of non-hazardous and hazardous materials, many times packing group II and III. Caged IBC containers can be fabricated according to various manufacturing requirements as well as construction materials for container durability and compatibility.

Engineering & Specifications 
Caged IBC totes are thermoplastic blow-mold engineered, often, from virgin high-density polyethylene (HDPE), a BPA free, strong plastic. Caged tote engineering is a top port inlet with cap for filling of cargo (commonly 6") with a bottom discharge outlet port--common is 2" ball valves--and an integrated pallet base skid for maneuvering the IBC. The pallet base of composite IBCs often features 4-way access channels for universal handling by moving equipment such as forklifts and pallet jacks.

Caged IBC engineering has been to produce a multi-industry use container that is mobile, convenient, consistent, durable, as well as compatible. The high-density polyethylene used in the construction of rigid, poly caged IBC totes is a durable thermoplastic chosen for its compatibility with many chemicals and materials often employed throughout industries, commercial applications, agriculture as well as consumer-based uses, as caged IBCs are often repurposed for aquaponic gardening. 

Caged intermediate bulk containers are standardized for manufacture to near a commonly-accepted pallet size. Caged IBCs are often 45"L x 40"W x 46"H for 275 gallons and 48"L x 40"W x 53"H for 330 gallons, where both volume types are available in either new, rebottled, or reconditioned model types, where: rebottled means a brand new HDPE liner in a previously-used but certified steel cage, and; reconditioned means a previously-used but cleaned and certified HDPE liner and cage

Uses 

 Water | Potable, drinking, non-drinking, process, waste, by-product
 Chemicals | Acids, bases, oils, solvents, intermediates, ionic salt compounds (avoiding marked incompatibilities) 
 Agriculture | Crop chemicals such as fertilizers, pesticides, herbicides, pesticides; Water
 Commercial | Production materials; Food industry ingredients, cargo; Construction materials, water, sand, paints, coatings

Safety

Acquisition & Disposal

References 

Containers
Packaging
Shipping containers